Fereydunshahr is a city and capital of Fereydunshahr County, about 150 kilometres west of the city of Isfahan in the western part of Isfahan Province, Iran. At the 2011 census, its population was 14,007, in 4,062 families.

Fereydunshahr is situated inside the Zagros mountain range. It has one of the country's largest population of ethnic Georgians (ფერეიდნელი). People from Fereydunshahr speak a Georgian language along with Persian. The Georgian alphabet is also used.

Gallery

See also 

Georgians in Iran

References

Muliani, S. (2001) Jaygah-e Gorjiha dar Tarikh va Farhang va Tamaddon-e Iran. Esfahan: Yekta [The Georgians’ position in the Iranian history and civilization].
Rahimi, M.M. (2001) Gorjiha-ye Iran; Fereydunshahr. Esfahan: Yekta [The Georgians of Iran; Fereydunshahr].
Sepiani, M. (1980) Iranian-e Gorji. Esfahan: Arash [Georgian Iranians].
Esfahan's tourist exhibition, mentions the Georgians from Fereydunshahr and Fereydan. The report of this exhibition is available in the web site of the Iranian Cultural Heritage News agency at: .
Saakashvili visited Fereydunshahr and put flowers on the graves of the Iranian Georgian martyrs' graves, showing respect towards this community .

Populated places in Fereydunshahr County
Cities in Isfahan Province
Georgia (country)–Iran relations